The Theban Tomb TT3 is located in Deir el-Medina, part of the Theban Necropolis, on the west bank of the Nile, opposite to Luxor. It is the burial place of the ancient Egyptian artisan (his exact title was Servant in the Place of Truth), Pashedu and his family.

Pashedu was a son of Menna and Huy. His wife was named Nedjmet-behdet.  Pashedu was also owner of TT326.

See also
 List of Theban tombs

References

Theban tombs